Bryan James Scott (born August 17, 1995) is an American gridiron football quarterback for the Toronto Argonauts of the Canadian Football League (CFL). He played college football at Occidental College and played in The Spring League. He played for the Philadelphia Stars of the United States Football League (USFL) in 2022.

Early life
Bryan Scott grew up in Rolling Hills, California. He was raised by his parents Robert and Leslie Scott, and has a sister, Lauren.

High school career
Scott played for Palos Verdes High School. He became the starting quarterback early in the 2012 season. During the 2012 season, he passed for a total of 1988 yards. In 2012, with Scott in the starting position, Palos Verdes won the Bay League title and the CIF Southern Section title for the first time in 47 years.

College career
From 2013 to 2017, Scott attended Occidental College, in California, majoring in urban environmental policy. In his true-freshman season at Occidental, Scott was selected for the SCIAC All-Conference Second Team, and named Newcomer of the Year. In the last game of his freshman year Scott passed for 473 yards and six touchdowns, setting single game records at Occidental in each category. In 2014 Scott was selected to play for the U-19 USA National Football Team. Scott led Team USA to a Gold Medal finish at the IFAF World Championship in Kuwait. Scott brought his team back from a 14–12 deficit at halftime, with four consecutive passing touchdowns, to capture the Gold Medal. He was awarded with the IFAF tournament's MVP award. Later, during the 2014 season, Scott was selected for the SCIAC All-Conference First Team after leading the conference in every major passing category. During his tenure at Occidental, Scott set nine school records and three Southern California Intercollegiate Athletic Conference records: career passing yards (9073), completions (763), and total offense (9475). He was named first-team all-conference quarterback, Occidental's team MVP, and Occidental's team captain in the 2016 season. That season, he was also named SCIAC Player of the Year. In 2016, Scott's final season with Occidental, he passed for over 3000 yards in nine games played with 27 touchdowns. It was also the season that he became the all-time passing yardage leader for both Occidental College and the SCIAC, with 9073 yards, 77 touchdowns, and 22 interceptions in 33 career games.

College statistics

Professional career

BC Lions 
In March 2017, Scott attended USC's Pro Day workout, completing 62 of 64 passes with one drop. Scott signed with the BC Lions of the Canadian Football League (CFL) on April 18, 2017, but was released on May 1, 2017. Scott had a rookie mini-camp tryout with his hometown team, the Los Angeles Rams, following the 2017 NFL Draft.

The Spring League 
In April 2018, Scott participated in The Spring League, where he was named Player of the Game for two games. His performance led a workout with the Kansas City Chiefs. In May 2018, he tried out at rookie mini-camps with the Chiefs and Atlanta Falcons.

Edmonton Eskimos 
Scott was signed to the practice roster of the Edmonton Eskimos on October 8, 2019. He was released from the practice roster and signed to a futures contract for the 2020 season on October 14, 2019. After the CFL canceled the 2020 season due to the COVID-19 pandemic, Scott chose to opt-out of his contract with the Eskimos on August 31, 2020.

The Spring League (second stint) 
Scott was selected by the Generals of The Spring League (TSL) during its player selection draft on October 12, 2020. He won the starting quarterback competition against Zach Mettenberger. Scott led the Generals to an undefeated 4-0 season and the 2020 championship, with a win over the Aviators 37-14. He went 22-of-32, 264 yards, and three touchdowns passing, 25 yards rushing and a touchdown, and won his second TSL MVP, and becoming the only quarterback to throw for 1000 yards and complete 10 touchdowns in a TSL season. Scott was awarded as the MVP of The Spring League Championship in 2020. Scott worked out for the Indianapolis Colts in February 2021.

Philadelphia Stars 
On February 22, 2022, Scott was drafted third overall by the Philadelphia Stars of the United States Football League (USFL). After the second week of play, Scott led the league in passing yards (474), touchdowns (four), and completion percentage (70.8%). He was transferred to the inactive roster on May 5, 2022, with ankle and knee injuries. He was placed on injured reserve on June 1, 2022. His Stars jersey was included as part of a USFL exhibit at the Pro Football Hall of Fame.

Vegas Vipers 
Scott was assigned to the Vegas Vipers of the XFL on January 1, 2023, after his USFL contract expired. He was released on January 30, 2023.

Toronto Argonauts
Scott signed with the Toronto Argonauts of the CFL on March 1, 2023.

Statistics

References

External links
Edmonton Eskimos bio

1995 births
Living people
Players of American football from California
Sportspeople from Los Angeles County, California
American football quarterbacks
Occidental Tigers football players
People from Rolling Hills, California
BC Lions players
Edmonton Elks players
The Spring League players
Philadelphia Stars (2022) players
Vegas Vipers players
Toronto Argonauts players